Wanzai County is a county under the administration of the prefecture-level city of Yichun in the northwest of Jiangxi province, China, bordering Hunan province to the west. The name Wanzai literally means "10,000 years". It could also mean"10,000 loads" and could likely be related to its past importance as a center of trade. It is located along the Long He or Dragon River, a tributary of the main river of the province, the Gan River.

The Wanzai area was first settled 3,000 years ago. It was a prosperous city in the Ming and Qing Dynasties. Like much of Jiangxi it was also important in fostering the Chinese Communist Revolution. Today it a small city with major industries including fireworks manufacturing and rice liquor distillation. Most economic activity is agricultural with rice being the major crop. Its position along the 320 National Highway has helped insure steady economic growth and better access to Pingxiang and Yichun in the west and Nanchang in the north. Like much of western Jiangxi, Wanzai is surrounded by forested mountains. This mountainous region of Jiangxi is home to many different dialects of the Gan Chinese language. Yi-Ping, the Wanzai dialect, is both geographically and linguistically between the Nanchang and Yichun dialects.

Administrative divisions
In the present, Wanzai County has 1 subdistrict , 9 towns and 7 townships. 
1 subdistrict
 Kangle

9 towns

7 townships

Climate

References

External links
Wanzai commune(Chinese)

 
County-level divisions of Jiangxi